The Hunt-Phelan House is a historic mansion in Memphis, Tennessee, USA.

History
The two-story mansion was built circa 1830 for George H. Whyett. It was designed in the Federal architectural style. It was expanded in 1855. Prior to the war, Jefferson Davis visited the house as a guest.

During the American Civil War, the mansion was used as headquartered by Union General Ulysses S. Grant, followed by Confederate General Leonidas Polk.

After the war, Davis returned to the house as a guest. Later, President Andrew Johnson was also a guest.

Architectural significance
It has been listed on the National Register of Historic Places since February 11, 1971.

References

Houses on the National Register of Historic Places in Tennessee
Federal architecture in Tennessee
Houses completed in 1830
Houses in Memphis, Tennessee
National Register of Historic Places in Memphis, Tennessee